Cool Kids is a South Korean variety show program on JTBC starring Yoo Jae-suk, Kim Shin-young, Ahn Jung-hwan, Haon and Kwanghee.

The show airs starting from December 2, 2018. It is broadcast by JTBC on Sundays at 23:20 (KST) and had ended on May 12, 2019.

Synopsis 
The show welcomes the kids to personally create their videos and submit to the show starting from November 19, 2018.

From episode 1 to 6, the 6 casts will split into three teams. Afterwards, all the team members will watch the selected 10 applicants' videos that kids personally created to review during the studio recording. Later on, each team will choose one kid team that they want to spend the day with and give them a call. The casts will meet the kids the week after the call.

Starting from episode 7 to 10, the grouping method changes and all the cast move in a group rather than splitting into 3 groups. In addition, the casts only watch 2 or 3 applicants' videos instead of the usual 10. From there, they will only choose 1 kid team instead of 3. They will also meet them right away after calling the chosen kids instead of meeting them the week after the call.

From episode 11 to 15, the casts will only watch 2 applicants' videos and vote. They will meet the chosen kid(s) a week later so that the kid(s) is/are prepared.

From episode 16, the production team will decide ahead of filming day on which kid(s) to visit.

Casts

Changes in Casts 
On episode 7, the 4 MCs announced that Hyun-min and Seulgi had officially left the show.

On episode 9, it was announced that Kwanghee will officially be joining the remaining cast.

Groups

Guests

Ratings

Season 1
List of ratings in 2018-2019 (Episodes 1–present)
 Ratings listed below are the individual corner ratings of Cool Kids. (Note: Individual corner ratings do not include commercial time, which regular ratings include.)

Notes

References

External links 
 

2018 South Korean television series debuts
2019 South Korean television series endings
Korean-language television shows
South Korean variety television shows
JTBC original programming